Arild Østbø (born 19 April 1991) is a Norwegian footballer who plays as a goalkeeper for Viking.

Career
Østbø was born in Stavanger and joined the senior team of Viking FK in 2008. He formerly played for Buøy IL. He made his Viking debut in the 2008 Norwegian Football Cup, but his Tippeligaen debut came in 2010.

From 2009 to 2010 he was on loan in Sandnes Ulf; the deal was terminated after Sandnes Ulf got Bo Andersen as their first-choice goalkeeper.

Following Alexander Lund Hansen's transfer from Start to Rosenborg, Østbø was on 9 August 2012 loaned out to Start for the rest of the 2012-season.

Ahead of the 2013 season, Viking's first-choice goalkeeper Rune Jarstein wanted to leave the club to play abroad. When the international transfer window closed on 1 February 2013, Jarstein was however still a Viking-player, and Viking wanted to loan out Østbø instead. Østbø joined the First Division side Strømmen on a season-long loan-deal in February 2013, where Viking had an option to recall Østbø if Jarstein were sold in the summer. After his loan deal ended, he was poised to return to Viking as the successor of Jarstein.

On 2 November 2015, he signed a two-year contract with Sarpsborg 08. After one season in Sarpsborg, Østbø signed a three-year contract with Rosenborg in January 2017.

On 24 September 2019, Viking announced that Østbø would return to the club, signing a three-year contract ahead of the 2020 season.

Career statistics

Club

References

1991 births
Living people
Sportspeople from Stavanger
Norwegian footballers
Norway youth international footballers
Norway under-21 international footballers
Association football goalkeepers
Viking FK players
Sandnes Ulf players
IK Start players
Strømmen IF players
Sarpsborg 08 FF players
Rosenborg BK players
Eliteserien players
Norwegian First Division players